Mattias Andersson (born 13 March 1998) is a Swedish footballer who plays as a centre-back.

Club career
In late August 2016 Malmö FF confirmed that they had sold Andersson to Juventus F.C. For the 2016 Supercoppa Italiana final versus A.C. Milan Andersson was included in the Juventus squad, however he did not make an appearance. In September of 2017 it was announced that Andersson would leave Juventus on loan to FC Den Bosch. Andersson made his Eerste Divisie debut for FC Den Bosch on 22 September 2017 in a game against FC Eindhoven. In the summer of 2019, Andersson transferred to FC Sion in the Swiss Super League.

On 31 January 2022, Andersson signed a six-month contract with Danish Superliga club Randers. He left the club again at the end of the season.

References

External links
 

1998 births
Living people
Footballers from Malmö
Swedish footballers
Swedish expatriate footballers
Sweden youth international footballers
Association football defenders
IF Limhamn Bunkeflo (men) players
Malmö FF players
Juventus F.C. players
FC Den Bosch players
Juventus Next Gen players
FC Sion players
Randers FC players
Eerste Divisie players
Danish Superliga players
Swedish expatriate sportspeople in Italy
Swedish expatriate sportspeople in the Netherlands
Swedish expatriate sportspeople in Switzerland
Swedish expatriate sportspeople in Denmark
Expatriate footballers in Italy
Expatriate footballers in the Netherlands
Expatriate footballers in Switzerland
Expatriate men's footballers in Denmark